Hans Viktor Rosendahl (27 December 1944 – 23 November 2021) was a Swedish freestyle swimmer. He competed at the 1964 Summer Olympics in the 400 m and 4 × 200 m and finished fifth in the relay. He won a gold and a silver medal in these events at the 1962 European Aquatics Championships.

References

1944 births
2021 deaths
European Aquatics Championships medalists in swimming
Olympic swimmers of Sweden
Swedish male freestyle swimmers
Swimmers at the 1964 Summer Olympics
People from Katrineholm Municipality
Sportspeople from Södermanland County